Podpalattsy is a rural locality (a settlement) in Bugryshikhinsky Selsoviet, Kuryinsky District, Altai Krai, Russia. The population was 9 as of 2013. There are 2 streets.

Geography 
Podpalattsy is located 68 km southeast of Kurya (the district's administrative centre) by road. Bugryshikha is the nearest rural locality.

References 

Rural localities in Kuryinsky District